Gian Franco Morini (born October 23, 1984 in Bologna, Italy) is a music video and film director, film editor and writer.

Biography
He attended Collegio San Luigi in Bologna, where he obtained a scientific high school degree.

He later graduated in Communication & Marketing in June 2006 at L.UN.A. (Libera Universita' delle Arti), after a 3-year course. At that point he was asked to join the university's research team: C.R.L. (Centro Ricerche Luna). He started working on all the projects they were involved in, as the "Portale Moda Italiano", in collaboration with Comune di Milano and Camera Nazionale della Moda Italiana (in English: "The National Chamber for Italian Fashion"), an association which co-ordinates and promotes the development of Italian fashion and is responsible for hosting the fashion events and shows of Milan Fashion Week (in Italian: "Settimana della Moda"), the famous fashion week held every six months in Milan.

The Portale Moda Italiano ("Portal for Italian Fashion") is a project that aims to recover the cultural heritage of Italian fashion. Built on digital databases, digitized magazines and collections coming from both private and public museums, the Portal has already made 10 million documents, 1500 sources and 5000 archives available. The Portal is divided into three different sections: the "Historical Network" (with sources and documents), a "Real Time Network" (containing all the lists of contemporary fashion professionals) and a "Trend Network" (that makes the analysis of the international trends found on the web possible).

In September 2007, in order to focus on his directing career, he decided to move to New York City, where he attended a 2 year filmmaking course at New York Film Academy.

Filmography
 Bolero Magazine Video Editorial: February Issue [2011]
 Love American Skin [2011]
 Frank [2011]
 Rod Stone & Frankstarr – I'm a Tigör [2010]
 Tony Snake – VaMPiReS éLéCTRiQUeS [2010]
 o.V.N.I. [2010]
 Tony Snake – Avoid the Chainsaw [2010]
 Culture Prophet – Hustler [2009]

Awards
 Winner of: 2011 Canada International Film Festival, Award of Excellence.
 Winner of: 2011 Big Vision Empty Wallet New York Music Video Competition, Audience Choice Award.
 Winner of: 2010 Los Angeles Cinema Festival of Hollywood, Award of Merit.
 Winner of: 2010 Los Angeles Movie Awards – Summer Edition, Award of Excellence.
 Winner of: 2010 Los Angeles Movie Awards – Summer Edition, Award for Best Editing.
 Winner of: 2010 Los Angeles Reel Film Festival, Honorable Mention.
 Winner of: 2010 Los Angeles Reel Film Festival, Award for Best Song.
 Winner of: 2010 Nevada Film Festival, Golden Reel Award.
 Winner of: 2010 Indie Fest, Award of Merit.
 Winner of: 2010 Los Angeles Movie Awards – Winter Edition, Award of Excellence.
 Winner of: 2010 Los Angeles Movie Awards – Winter Edition, Award for Best Editing.
 Official Selection 2011 Buffalo Niagara Film Festival.
 Official Finalist 2010 Las Vegas Film Festival, Best Music Video.
 Official Selection 2010 Beverly Hills Film, TV and New Media Festival.

Collaborations

For Tony Snake, he wrote, directed and edited the commercial "Avoid the Chainsaw", using an old animation stand and the technique of photoanimation, combined with modern digital software.

He later used photoanimation, combined with the anaglyph technique, when he collaborated with Culture Prophet on the project "Culture Prophet – Hustler", that he wrote, directed and edited.
The project was shot in Nevada in the Las Vegas Valley and the Red Rock Canyon National Conservation Area.

He finally worked with Daryl Xavier Stone and Francesco Frankstarr Parlatore, on the project "Rod Stone & Frankstarr: I'm a Tigör", that he wrote, directed, animated and edited.

Academy's years 
While student at the New York Film Academy, he shot an unofficial music video for Mr. Oizo's track "Positif", as one of the projects in the 2-year course. A-Trak (born Alain Macklovitc), Kanye West's dj, published an article on his blog about it believing was the official work of his good friend Quentin Dupieux a.k.a. Mr. Oizo. Quentin Dupieux himself had to comment on the video indicating how he was not, in fact, the author of the clip.

An unofficial "horror" music video about vegetables' tortures that he wrote, directed, edited and acted in, for The Bloody Beetroots, while still in film school, has now over 800,000 views on YouTube. The project was shot on Kodak Plus-X film, with an old Arriflex camera made in Western Germany during the 1950s.

Collaborators
His most important collaborators are with the photographer Don Gerardo Frasco and the assistant director Gaia Baldini.

Present time
In November 2010 he started working with Gala (born Gala Rizzatto), an Italian pop singer-songwriter.

He edited the first feature film by the fashion and arts photographer Diana Scheunemann, "Love American Skin".
They started their collaboration in 2011 with a video editorial for Bolero Magazin, featuring the model Charlotte Kemp Muhl, the face of Maybelline New York and Jennifer Lopez's clothing brand J Lo, and involved in the musical project titled "The Ghost of a Saber Tooth Tiger" with Sean Ono Lennon, with whom she also formed the record company "Chimera Music". The editorial has been featured both on the February print issue of the magazine and distributed on the web version of it.

Interviews
 "New York Film Academy Graduate Wins Several Film Festival Awards, New York Film Academy

References

External links
 
 

Italian film directors
Italian film editors
Italian music video directors
Film people from Bologna
Italian screenwriters
Italian male screenwriters
New York Film Academy alumni
1984 births
Living people